This is a list of translators who contributed to Nepal and Nepali language.

A
 Abhi Subedi – poet, playwright, translator, essayist

B
 Bhanubhakta Acharya

K
Kshetra Pratap Adhikary

M
Manjushree Thapa

S
 Suman Pokhrel – poet, translator, artist

Y
 Yuyutsu Sharma – poet, editor and translator

 
Translators